Dezq is a village in Darzab Rural District, in the Central District of Mashhad County, Razavi Khorasan Province, Iran. At the 2006 census, its population was 601, in 158 families.

References 

Populated places in Mashhad County